William Nixon (1803–1900) was a Scottish minister of the Free Church of Scotland who served as Moderator of the General Assembly in 1868/69. In Montrose he was nicknamed the "Lion of St John's".

Life
He was born in Camlachie in central Scotland on 3 May 1803. His father John Nixon was a merchant in Glasgow.

He studied at Glasgow University from 1814 aged only 10 (14 was then the norm to attend university). However he did not graduate until 1825. He then assisted at Whitsome in the Scottish Borders for 5 years.

He was ordained by the Church of Scotland in 1831. He was assistant to Andrew Robson at Newcastle-upon-Tyne. He was installed at Hexham in Northumberland (the Scottish churches were also represented in the north of England). In 1833 he was translated to St John's Church in Montrose to replace the Rev Thomas Liddell.

In the Disruption of 1843 he left the established church and joined the Free Church of Scotland. Because St John's was a quoad sacra church it was permitted to transfer to the Free Church. A new manse was not built until 1862.

In 1863 he succeeded Rev Robert Candlish as Convenor of the Free Church Education Committee and was one of the main forces in the creation of the 600 Free Church schools and organised their transfer to the state in the Education Act of 1872. In 1868 he succeeded Rev Robert Smith Candlish as Moderator of the General Assembly, the highest position in the Free Church.

He retired in 1876 and moved to Edinburgh living at 3 Seton Place in the Grange. In 1892 he relocated to Burntisland to be near family and he died there on 24 January 1900 aged 96.

His position at St Johns Free Church was filled by Rev George S Sutherland.

Publications
Introductory Essay  to  Mair's  Explanation  of  the Assembly's  Shorter  Catechism  (Montrose, 1837)
Remarks  on  Christian  Education (Edinburgh,  1838)
Reply  to  Anti-Endowment  Speakers  and  Defence  of  Church Extension  Scheme  (Glasgow,  1839)
Civil and  Spiritual  Jurisdiction,  a  sermon (Edinburgh,  1840)
Our  Duty  to  the Young  (Edinburgh,  1841)
Sixty-one  Pleas for  Sabbath-breaking  answered  (Edinburgh, 1847)
Account  of  the  late  Work  of  God  at Ferryden  (Edinburgh,  1860)
The  Doctrine of  Election  (1861)
The Kingdom  of  the  Nations,  and  the  Duty  of Earthly  Riders  to  His  Truth  and  Kingdom, a  sermon  (Edinburgh,  1869)
A  Forewarning of  the  Troubles  before  us,  from  the present  Movement  for  the  Union  of  the Churches  (Montrose,  1870)
All and in All,  published sermons  (1882)
Instrumental  Music in  the  Public  Worship  of  our  Church Unwarranted  (Edinburgh,  1883)
Sermon XLIII.  (Free  Church  Pulpit,  i.)
joint editor  of  The  Free  Church  Missionary Record from 1844 to 1853

Family
In 1835 he married Margaret Sidgley. Following her death in 1865 he married Janet Craig in 1875.

Children from the first marriage included John Nixon (1836–1886) Free Church minister of Barrhill, South Ayrshire.

References

Citations

Sources

1803 births
1900 deaths
Alumni of the University of Glasgow
19th-century Ministers of the Free Church of Scotland